ZotZ is a candy manufactured by G.B. Ambrosoli S.p.A. in Italy and distributed in the United States by Andre Prost, Inc. It is a fizzy, sour center hard candy that contains sherbet.

ZotZ flavours include apple, blue raspberry, cherry, grape, orange, strawberry and watermelon.  

ZotZ is the official candy of American Endurance Racing (AER).

Ingredients
ZotZ contain; sugar, corn syrup, malic acid, sodium bicarbonate, tartaric acid, artificial flavours and colouring, and maltose carbonate.

History
ZotZ were introduced to the U.S. in 1970.

Marketing
Tag lines include "Where the Fizz izz", "Big Fizz Candy" and "Exploding pop".

See also
Sherbet lemons

References

External links
Zotz History and Images

Brand name confectionery
Products introduced in 1968
Italian confectionery